Lázně Bělohrad is a spa town in Jičín District in the Hradec Králové Region of the Czech Republic. It has about 3,600 inhabitants.

Administrative parts
Villages of Brtev, Dolní Javoří, Dolní Nová Ves, Horní Nová Ves, Hřídelec, Lány, Prostřední Nová Ves and Uhlíře are administrative parts of Lázně Bělohrad.

Geography

It lies mostly in the Jičín Uplands. The Javorka River flows through the town. There are several small ponds around the town.

History
The today's town was created from the settlement Nová Ves, first mentioned in 1354. In the 16th century, a new fortress was established nearby and was called Bělohrad after its white walls (derived from Bílý hrad, meaning "White Castle"). In 1626–1643, it was owned by Albrecht von Wallenstein. During the rule of Guillaume de Lamboy, the village was settled by German colonists. From 1669, it was again acquired by the Waldstein family. In 1722, it was promoted to a market town by Charles VI, and Nová Ves became a part of Bělohrad.

In 1871, the railway was built and Bělohrad developed rapidly. In 1880, the spa (now part of the town's name) was founded, and in 1885, first spa buildings were built.

Demographics

Economy
Lázně Bělohrad is known for its sulfur peat spa, which is among the largest employers in the town. The spa focuses on the treatment of musculoskeletal disorders, gynecological, neurological and skin diseases.

Sights

The Bělohrad Castle was a Renaissance castle built around 1550. It was rebuilt around 1721, probably by Jan Santini Aichel. The castle is surrounded by a freely accessible castle park. In the park is located Memorial to Karel Václav Rais, who is the most notable native. The memorial is located in the Empire style building of the former orangery, which dates from 1831. In the memorial there is a museum with an exhibition about the life and work of Rais, and about the history of the town.

The Church of All Saints was first documented in 1354. In 1689–1700, it was replaced by the current early Baroque building.

Notable people
Karel Václav Rais (1859–1926), novelist

Twin towns – sister cities

Lázně Bělohrad is twinned with:
 Belene, Bulgaria

References

External links

Spa in the town

Cities and towns in the Czech Republic
Populated places in Jičín District
Spa towns in the Czech Republic